Radical 86 or radical fire meaning "fire" is one of the 34 Kangxi radicals (214 radicals in total) composed of 4 strokes.

In the Kangxi Dictionary, there are 639 characters (out of 49,030) to be found under this radical.

In the Chinese wuxing ("Five Phases"), 火 represents the element Fire. In Taoist cosmology, 火 (Fire) is the nature component of the Ba gua diagram  Lí.

 is also the 95th indexing component in the Table of Indexing Chinese Character Components predominantly adopted by Simplified Chinese dictionaries published in mainland China, with  being its associated indexing component.

Evolution

Derived characters

Literature

External links

Unihan Database - U+706B

086
095